La Rochelle (Poitevin-Saintongeais: La Rochéle) is a city on the west coast of France and a seaport on the Bay of Biscay, a part of the Atlantic Ocean. It is the capital of the Charente-Maritime department. With 75,735 inhabitants in 2017, La Rochelle is the most populated commune in the department and ranks fifth in the New Aquitaine region after Bordeaux, the regional capital, Limoges, Poitiers and Pau. Its inhabitants are called "les Rochelaises" and "les Rochelais".

Situated on the edge of the Atlantic Ocean the city is connected to the Île de Ré by a  bridge completed on 19 May 1988. Since the Middle-Ages the harbour has opened onto a protected strait, the Pertuis d'Antioche and is regarded as a "Door océane" or gateway to the ocean because of the presence of its three ports (fishing, trade and yachting). The city has a strong commercial tradition, having an active port from very early on in its history. La Rochelle underwent sustained development in the middle ages, and has maintained a standing in modern times because of its port, La Pallice, the only deep water port of the French Atlantic coast; it is ranked as the sixth most important port of France.

The city traces its origins to the Gallo-Roman period, attested by the remains of important salt marshes and villas. The Dukes of Aquitaine granted it a charter as a free port in 1130. With the opening of the English market following the second marriage of Eleanor of Aquitaine in 1152, the presence of the Knights Templar and the Knights of Saint John of Jerusalem quickly made this small town the largest port on the Atlantic.

To this day, the city still possesses a rich historical fabric, including the Saint-Nicholas tower, and an urban heritage. The capital of Aunis, it has become the most important coastal city between the Loire and Gironde estuaries. La Rochelle's urban activities are many in number and strongly differentiated, being a city with port and industrial functions that are still important, but also including a predominantly administrative and tertiary sector that is reinforced by the university and a rapidly developing tourism industry. In the early 21st century, the city has consistently been ranked among France's most liveable cities.

History

Antiquity

The area of La Rochelle was occupied in antiquity by the Gallic tribe of the Santones, who gave their name to the nearby region of Saintonge and the city of Saintes.

The Romans subsequently occupied the area, where they developed salt production along the coast. They also developed wine production, shipping its products throughout the Empire. Roman villas have been found at Saint-Éloi and at Les Minimes. Salt evaporation ponds dating from the same period have also been found.

Foundation
La Rochelle was founded during the 10th century and became an important harbour in the 12th century. The name was first recorded in 961 as Rupella, from a Latin diminutive meaning 'little rock'. It was later known as Rocella and Roscella before the name took on its current form. The establishment of La Rochelle as a harbour was a consequence of the victory of Duke Guillaume X of Aquitaine over Isambert de Châtelaillon in 1130, and the subsequent destruction of his harbour of Châtelaillon. In 1137, Guillaume X to all intents and purposes made La Rochelle a free port and gave it the right to identify as a commune.

Fifty years later Eleanor of Aquitaine upheld the communal charter promulgated by her father. For the first time in France, a city mayor was appointed for La Rochelle, Guillaume de Montmirail. Guillaume was assisted in his responsibilities by 24 municipal magistrates, and 75 nobles who had jurisdiction over the inhabitants. Under the communal charter, the city obtained many privileges, such as the right to mint its own coins, and to operate some businesses free of royal taxes, factors which would favour the development of the entrepreneurial middle-class (bourgeoisie).

Plantagenet rule (1154–1224)

Eleanor married Henry Plantagenet in 1152, who became king of England as Henry II in 1154, thus putting La Rochelle under Plantagenet rule, until Louis VIII captured it in the 1224 siege of La Rochelle. During the Plantagenet control of the city in 1185, Henry II had the Vauclair castle built, remains of which are still visible in the Place de Verdun.

The main activities of the city were in the areas of maritime commerce and trade, especially with England, the Netherlands and Spain. In 1196, wealthy bourgeois Alexandre Auffredi sent a fleet of seven ships to Africa seeking wealth. He went bankrupt awaiting the return of his ships; they returned seven years later bearing riches.

Knights Templar
The Knights Templar had a strong presence in La Rochelle since before the time of Eleanor of Aquitaine, who exempted them from duties and gave them mills in her 1139 Charter. La Rochelle was the Templars' largest base on the Atlantic Ocean, and where they stationed their main fleet. From La Rochelle, they were able to act as intermediaries in trade between England and the Mediterranean. A popular thread of conspiracy theory originating with Holy Blood, Holy Grail has it that the Templars used a fleet of 18 ships which had brought Jacques de Molay from Cyprus to La Rochelle to escape arrest in France. The fleet allegedly left laden with knights and treasures just before the issue of the warrant for the arrest of the Order in October 1307.

Hundred Years' War
During the Hundred Years' War in 1360, following the Treaty of Brétigny La Rochelle again came under the rule of the English monarch. La Rochelle however expelled the English in June 1372, following the naval Battle of La Rochelle, between Castilian-French and English fleets. The French and Spanish decisively defeated the English, securing French control of the Channel for the first time since the Battle of Sluys in 1340. The naval battle of La Rochelle was one of the first cases of the use of handguns on warships, which were deployed by the French and Spanish against the English. Having recovered freedom, La Rochelle refused entry to Du Guesclin, until Charles V recognized the privileges of the city in November 1372.

In 1402, the French adventurer Jean de Béthencourt left La Rochelle and sailed along the coast of Morocco to conquer the Canary Islands.

Until the 15th century, La Rochelle was to be the largest French harbour on the Atlantic coast, dealing mainly in wine, salt and cheese.

French Wars of Religion

During the Renaissance, La Rochelle adopted Protestant ideas. Calvinism started to be propagated in the region of La Rochelle, resulting in its suppression through the establishment of Cours présidiaux tribunals by Henry II. An early result of this was the burning at the stake of two "heretics" in La Rochelle in 1552. Conversions to Calvinism however continued, due to a change of religious beliefs, but also to a desire for political independence on the part of the local elite, and a popular opposition to royal expenses and requisitions in the building projects to fortify the coast against England.

On the initiative of Gaspard de Coligny, the Calvinists attempted to colonise the New World to find a new home for their religion, with the likes of Pierre Richier and Jean de Léry. After the short-lived attempt of France Antarctique, they failed to establish a colony in Brazil, and finally resolved to make a stand in La Rochelle itself. Pierre Richier became "Ministre de l'église de la Rochelle" ("Minister of the Church of La Rochelle") when he returned from Brazil in 1558, and was able to considerably increase the Huguenot presence in La Rochelle, from a small base of about 50 souls who had been secretly educated in the Lutheran faith by Charles de Clermont the previous year. He has been described, by Lancelot Voisin de La Popelinière, as "le père de l'église de La Rochelle" ("The Father of the Church of La Rochelle").

La Rochelle was the first French city, with Rouen, to experience iconoclastic riots in 1560, at the time of the suppression of the Amboise conspiracy, before the riots spread to many other cities. Further cases of Reformation iconoclasm were recorded in La Rochelle from 30 May 1562, following the Massacre of Vassy. Protestants pillaged churches, destroyed images and statues, and also assassinated 13 Catholic priests in the Tower of the Lantern.

From 1568, La Rochelle became a centre for the Huguenots, and the city declared itself an independent Reformed Republic on the model of Geneva. During the subsequent period, La Rochelle became an entity that has been described as a "state within a state". This led to numerous conflicts with the Catholic central government. The city supported the Protestant movement of William of Orange in the Netherlands, and from La Rochelle the Dutch under Louis of Nassau and the Sea Beggars were able to raid Spanish shipping.

In 1571 the city of La Rochelle suffered a naval blockade by the French Navy under the command of Filippo di Piero Strozzi and Antoine Escalin des Aimars, a former protagonist of the Franco-Ottoman alliance. The city was finally besieged during the siege of La Rochelle (1572–1573) during the French Wars of Religion, following the St. Bartholomew's Day massacre in August 1572, and occurred at the same time as other sieges of Protestant cities such as the siege of Sancerre. The conflict ended with the 1573 Peace of La Rochelle, which restricted the Protestant worship to the three cities of Montauban, Nîmes and La Rochelle. Pierre Richier died in La Rochelle in 1580.

Huguenot rebellions

Under Henry IV, and under the regency of his son Louis XIII, the city enjoyed a certain freedom and prosperity. However, La Rochelle entered into conflict with the authority of the adult Louis, beginning with a 1622 revolt. A fleet from La Rochelle fought a royal fleet of 35 ships under Charles, Duke of Guise, in front of Saint-Martin-de-Ré, but was defeated on 27 October 1622, leading to the signing of the Peace of Montpellier.

Revolt of Soubise (1625)

In 1625, a new Huguenot revolt led by Duke Henri de Rohan and his brother Soubise led to the Capture of Ré island by the forces of Louis XIII. Soubise conquered large parts of the Atlantic coast, but the supporting fleet of La Rochelle was finally defeated by Montmorency, as was Soubise with 3,000 when he led a counter-attack against the royal troops who had landed on the island of Ré.

Siege of La Rochelle (1627–1628)

Following these events, Louis XIII and his Chief Minister Cardinal Richelieu declared the suppression of the Huguenot revolt the first priority of the kingdom. The English came to the support of La Rochelle, starting the Anglo-French War, by sending a major expedition under the Duke of Buckingham. The expedition however ended in a fiasco for England with the siege of Saint-Martin-de-Ré. Meanwhile, cannon shots were exchanged on 10 September 1627 between La Rochelle and Royal troops. This resulted in the siege of La Rochelle in which Cardinal Richelieu blockaded the city for 14 months, until the city surrendered and lost its mayor and its privileges.

The remaining Protestants of La Rochelle suffered new persecutions, when 300 families were again expelled in November 1661, the year Louis XIV came to power. The reason for the expulsions was that Catholics deeply resented a degree of revival of Protestant ownership of property within the city.

The growing persecution of the Huguenots culminated with the Revocation of the Edict of Nantes by Louis XIV in 1685. Many Huguenots emigrated, founding such cities as New Rochelle in the vicinity of today's New York in 1689. La Rochelle, and the siege of 1627 form much of the backdrop to the later chapters of Alexandre Dumas, père's classic novel, The Three Musketeers.

La Rochelle and the New World

[[File:La Rochelle slave ship Le Saphir 1741.jpg|thumb|La Rochelle slave ship Le Saphir ex-voto, 1741]]

Because of its western location, which saved days of sailing time, La Rochelle enjoyed successful fishing in the western Atlantic and trading with the New World, which served to counterbalance the disadvantage of not being at the mouth of a river (useful for shipping goods to and from the interior). Its Protestant ship-owning and merchant class prospered in the 16th century until the Wars of Religion devastated the city. The British navy in wartime were alert that shore watchers at La Rochelle were employed.

The period following the wars was a prosperous one, marked by intense exchanges with the New World (Nouvelle France in Canada, and the Antilles). La Rochelle armateurs (shipowners) became very active in triangular trade with the New World, dealing in the slave trade with Africa, sugar trade with plantations of the West Indies, and fur trade with Canada. This was a period of high artistic, cultural and architectural achievements for the city.  La Rochelle was also the port city from which the Carignan-Salieres Regiment departed for Nouvelle France.  In 1664, based upon attacks by the Iroquois against the Quebec inhabitants and following the request of the New France Sovereign Council,  the French finance minister Jean-Baptiste Colbert ordered the 24 companies composing the Carignan-Salières Regiment to duty in New France.  Beginning with departures from the port of La Rochelle, France on 19 Apr 1665, five troop ships and one supply ship left the French coast.  A sixth troop ship, Le Breze, began the journey from the Antilles island in the West Indies.   All of the seven ships arrived at Quebec City during the three-month period between 19 Jun 1665 and 14 Sep 1665.  They carried approximately 1,200 men of the regiment.  Additionally, it was from this port city that many of the estimated 768 women known as the Filles du Roi (Daughters of the King), set sail for Quebec during the period of 1663 to 1673.

Robert de La Salle departed from La Rochelle, France, on 24 July 1684, with the aim of setting up a colony at the mouth of the Mississippi, eventually establishing Fort Saint Louis in Texas.

The city eventually lost its trade and prominence during the decades spanning the Seven Years' War, the French Revolution and the Napoleonic Wars. During that period France lost many of the territorial possessions which it had had in the New World, and also saw a significant decrease in its sea power in the continuing conflicts with Britain, ultimately diminishing the role of such harbours as La Rochelle. After abolitionist movements led by such people as Samuel de Missy, the slave trade of La Rochelle ended with the onset of the French Revolution and the war with England in the 1790s, the last La Rochelle slave ship, the Saint-Jacques being captured in 1793 in the Gulf of Guinea. In February 1794, the National Convention passed the Law of 4 February 1794, which effectively freed all colonial slaves.

In 1809, the Battle of the Basque Roads took place near La Rochelle, in which a British fleet defeated the French Atlantic Fleet.

La Rochelle faience

La Rochelle became one of the French centres for faience at the end of the 18th century. Bernard Palissy was born in the region and had some bearing in this development. During the 18th century, its style was greatly influenced by Chinese themes and Japanese Kakiemon-type designs."The industry only really started to flourish in La Rochelle towards the middle of the 18th century (...) new everyday vessels were decorated "au petit feu" with flowers and Chinese figures then in fashion." Cahiers de la céramique du verre et des arts du feu, Issues 41–45 Musée national de céramique (France). Société des amis du Musée national de céramique, 1968 Many of these ceramics can be viewed at the Musée d'Orbigny-Bernon. 

19th century
In 1864, the harbour of La Rochelle (area of the "Bassin à flot" behind the water locks), was the site for the maiden dive experiments of the first mechanically-powered submarine in the World, Plongeur, commanded by Marie-Joseph-Camille Doré, a native of La Rochelle.

Second World War

During the Second World War, Germany established a submarine naval base at La Pallice (the main port of La Rochelle).

A German stronghold, La Rochelle was the last French city to be liberated at the end of the war. The Allied siege of La Rochelle took place between 12 September 1944 and 7 May 1945. The stronghold, including the islands of Ré and Oléron, was held by 20,000 German troops under German vice-admiral Ernst Schirlitz. Following negotiations by the French Navy frigate captain Meyer, the general German capitulation occurred on 7 May and French troops entered La Rochelle on 8 May.

The submarine base became the setting for parts of the movie Das Boot. The U-boat scenes in Raiders of the Lost Ark were also shot in La Rochelle. The base is featured in the computer game Commandos 2: Men of Courage. It was also chosen in 2018 for the location shooting of the German television series Das Boot (a sequel to the 1981 classic).

Geography

Geology

The bedrock of La Rochelle and surrounding areas is composed of layers of limestone dating back to the Sequanian stage (upper Oxfordian stage) of the Jurassic period (circa 160 million years ago), when a large part of France was submerged. Many of these layers are visible in the white cliffs that border the sea, which contain many small marine fossils. Layers of thick white rock, formed during period of relatively warm seas, alternate with highly fragile layers containing sand and remains of mud, formed during colder periods, and with layers containing various corals, that were formed during warmer, tropical times. The limestone thus formed is traditionally used as the main building material throughout the region.

Climate
Under Köppen's climate classification, La Rochelle features an oceanic climate. Although at the same latitude as Montreal in Canada or the Kuril islands in Russia, the area experiences mild weather throughout the year due to the influence of the Gulf Stream waters, the summers are relatively warm, and insolation is remarkably high—the highest in Western France, including sea resorts much further to the south such as Biarritz. La Rochelle seldom experiences very cold or very warm weather. These specific conditions – summer: dry and sunny, winter: mild and wet – have led to the establishment of a Mediterranean-type vegetation cohabiting with more continental and oceanic types of vegetation.

Population

The population data in the table and graph below refer to the commune of La Rochelle proper, in its geography at the given years. The commune of La Rochelle absorbed part of the former commune of Saint-Maurice in 1858 and Laleu in 1880.

Today

La Rochelle possesses a commercial deep water harbour, named La Pallice. The large submarine pens built during World War II still stand there, although they are not in use. La Pallice is equipped with oil unloading equipment, and mainly handles tropical wood. It is also the location of the fishing fleet, which was moved from the old harbour in the centre of the city during the 1980s.

La Rochelle also maintains strong links with the sea by harbouring the largest marina for pleasure boats in Europe at Les Minimes, and a rather rich boat-building industry which includes Amel Yachts.

La Rochelle has a very big aquarium, and a small botanical garden (the Jardin des plantes de La Rochelle).

The Calypso, the ship used by Jacques-Yves Cousteau as a mobile laboratory for oceanography, and which was sunk after a collision in the port of Singapore (1996) is now on display (sadly rotting) at the Maritime Museum of La Rochelle.

One of the biggest music festivals in France, "FrancoFolies", takes place each summer in La Rochelle, where Francophone musicians come together for a week of concerts and celebration. 2004 marked the 20th anniversary of this event. The French Socialist Party has held its annual summer convention (Université d'été) in La Rochelle since 1983.

La Rochelle is the setting for the best-selling series of French language textbooks in the UK, titled Tricolore. The central character, Martine Dhome, lives with her family at the fictional address of 12, rue de la République.

Tourism

La Rochelle's main feature is the "Vieux Port" ("Old Harbour"), which is at the heart of the city, picturesque and lined with seafood restaurants. The city walls are open to an evening promenade. The old town has been well preserved. Three medieval towers are a prominent tourist attraction at the entrance to the harbor: The Chain Tower, The Lantern Tower and Saint Nicolas Tower. From the harbour, boating trips can be taken to the Île d'Aix and Fort Boyard (home to the TV show of the same name). Nearby Île de Ré is a short drive to the North. The countryside of the surrounding Charente-Maritime is very rural and full of history (Saintes). To the North is Venise Verte, a marshy area of country, crisscrossed with tiny canals and a resort for inland boating. Inland is the country of Cognac and Pineau. The nearby Île de Ré is accessible via a bridge from La Rochelle.

Transport
La Rochelle and its region are served by the international La Rochelle - Île de Ré Airport, which has progressively developed over the last 5 years. The train station Gare de La Rochelle offers connections to Bordeaux, Nantes, Poitiers, Paris and several regional destinations.

OFP La Rochelle is a freight railway serving the port.

La Rochelle launched one of the first successful bicycle sharing systems in 1974. 

Education
The city has more than 10,000 students each year. The University of La Rochelle was established in 1993. Together with the Excelia Group (La Rochelle Business School), they are the largest institutions of higher education of La Rochelle (7,000 and 3,500 students respectively).

Landmarks

 Orbigny-Bernon Museum
 Muséum d'histoire naturelle de La Rochelle
 Saint-Louis Cathedral

Notable people

Born in La Rochelle
 François-Maurice Allotte de La Fuÿe, numismatist
 Antoine Albeau, windsurfer
Matthieu Androdias, world champion rower
 Gabrielle-Suzanne Barbot de Villeneuve, author of Beauty and the Beast
 Jacques Nicolas Billaud-Varenne, politician and revolutionary
 Aimé Bonpland, botanist
 William-Adolphe Bouguereau, painter
 Jean-Loup Chrétien, astronaut
 John Theophilus Desaguliers, physician and mathematician
 Guy-Victor Duperre, admiral
 Jean Duvignaud, writer
 Eugène Fromentin, writer and painter
 Nicolas Gargot de La Rochette, governor of Placentia
 Bernard Giraudeau, actor and director
 Jean Guiton, mayor during the siege of La Rochelle
 Grégory Havret, professional golfer
 Jacques-Léopold Heugel, music publisher
 Sébastien Hurtaud, classical cellist
 Guy Laroche, fashion designer
 Samuel de Missy, abolitionist
 Fabrice Neaud, artist and cartoonist
 Pierre-Jean-Baptiste Nougaret (1742–1823), author and playwright
 Victor Prevost, photographer
 Paul Ramadier, politician and member of the French Resistance
 René-Antoine Ferchault de Réaumur, scientist
 Winshluss, artist and cartoonist
 Jean-Louis Raduit de Souches, German Imperial Field Marshal
 Étienne Truteau, ancestor of Canadian Prime Ministers Pierre Trudeau and Justin Trudeau
 Clément Saunier, French classical trumpeter

Lived in La Rochelle
 Colette Besson, sprinter
 Saint Louis de Montfort, Roman Catholic priest
 Alcide d'Orbigny, botanist
 Marie Louise Trichet, nurse beatified by Pope John Paul II
 Georges Simenon, author and novelist
 Jean-Paul Sartre, philosopher and novelist

Sport
Stade Rochelais are a professional rugby union team in the Top 14 league. They play their home matches at Stade Marcel-Deflandre.

Since 1991 the city has annually hosted the Marathon de La Rochelle, the second-most popular marathon of France and an international-level race which featured 10,000 participants in 2010.

ES La Rochelle is the local football club.

In 2022, Stade Rochelais Basket promoted to the LNB Pro B. The team plays its home games at the	Salle Gaston-Neveur.

Twin towns – sister cities

La Rochelle is twinned with:
 New Rochelle, New York, United States, since 1910
 Acre, Israel, since 1972
 Petrozavodsk, Karelia, Russia, since 1973
 Lübeck, Schleswig-Holstein, Germany, since 1988
 Essaouira, Morocco, since 1999
 Santiago de Figueiró, Portugal, since 2003

See also

Communes of the Charente-Maritime department

References

 Boardman, John The Diffusion of Classical Art in Antiquity'', Princeton 1993

Bibliography

External links

 La Rochelle City council website
 

 
Populated coastal places in France
Communes of Charente-Maritime
Port cities and towns on the French Atlantic coast
Prefectures in France
German Navy submarine bases
Santones
Fortified settlements
Aunis
Populated places established in the 10th century
La Ro